Vlatko Mitkov (born 16 August 1981) is a Macedonian handball player who plays for UHK Krems.

References

External links
Gegnerkader HSG Wetzlar Saison 2006/2007

1981 births
Macedonian male handball players
HSG Wetzlar players
Living people
Sportspeople from Štip
Macedonian expatriate sportspeople in Austria
Macedonian expatriate sportspeople in Germany
Expatriate handball players
Handball-Bundesliga players